Darren E. Burrows (born September 12, 1966) is an American actor and director. He is best known for playing Ed Chigliak in the television series Northern Exposure. He also appeared in Cry-Baby, Amistad, Sunset Strip, Forty Shades of Blue, in a season six episode of The X-Files and in Season 9 (Episode 11) of CSI: Crime Scene Investigation.

Personal life
Burrows was born in Winfield, Kansas, the son of actor Billy Drago and stepson to actress Silvana Gallardo.  As a child, he briefly lived near Aulne, Kansas.

He currently lives in the Missouri Ozarks, with his wife Melinda Delgado, who is a French chef, and their four sons. Besides acting, Burrows is also a skilled engraver and jewelry maker.

Filmography

Television credits

Award nominations
He and the rest of the Northern Exposure cast were nominated in 1995 for the Screen Actors Guild Awards Outstanding Performance by an Ensemble in a Comedy Series.

References

External links
 
 
 Marion County Poor Farm History; Marion County Record; October 14, 1998

Living people
1966 births
20th-century American male actors
21st-century American male actors
American male film actors
American male television actors
American people of Romani descent
Male actors from Kansas
People from Winfield, Kansas